Prison Service of the Czech Republic ( or VS ČR) is the prison agency of the Czech Republic. Its head office is located in Prague District 4.  the head of the prison service is Simon Michailidis.

References

External links

 Prison Service of the Czech Republic
 Prison Service of the Czech Republic 

Prisons in the Czech Republic
Prison and correctional agencies
1993 establishments in the Czech Republic